Roger Hill may refer to:

Politicians
Roger Hill (died 1608) (1545–1608), MP for Taunton and Plympton Erle
Roger Hill (judge) (1605–1667), English judge and Member of Parliament
Roger Hill (of Denham) (1642–1729), son of Roger Hill (judge), MP for Wendover

Others
Roger P. Hill (1910–2001), Royal Navy officer; commander of various destroyers
Roger Hill (actor) (1948–2014), American actor
Buck Hill (musician) (born Roger Hill, 1927–2017), American jazz saxophonist